The first season of Matlock originally aired in the United States on NBC from September 23, 1986-May 12, 1987. The two-part episode "The Don" served as a backdoor pilot for Jake and the Fatman.

Cast

Main
 Andy Griffith as Ben Matlock
 Linda Purl as Charlene Matlock
 Kene Holliday as Tyler Hudson

Recurring
 Kari Lizer as Cassie Phillips
 Julie Sommars as ADA Julie March

Cast notes
 Lori Lethin was replaced by Linda Purl
 Linda Purl departed at the end of the season
 Linda Purl was absent for six episodes
 Kene Holiday was absent for one episode

Episodes

References

External links 
 

1986 American television seasons
1987 American television seasons
01